The Generation of 1928 (Spanish: Generación del 28) was a group of Venezuelan students who led protests in Caracas in 1928 against the dictatorship of Juan Vicente Gómez.

Members and exile 
Many politicians prominent in Venezuela's transition to democracy took part in the protests. They include Rómulo Betancourt, Jóvito Villalba, Juan Oropeza, Joaquin Gabaldon Marquez, Raúl Leoni, Andrés Eloy Blanco, Miguel Otero Silva, Pedro Sotillo, Francisco Ignacio Romero, Isaac J Pardo, Juan Bautista Fuenmayor, Germán Suárez Flamerich, and Gustavo Machado, and Antonia Palacios.

After the 1928 protests a number of the Generation of 1928 went into exile. Political organizations in exile included the founding of Agrupación Revolucionaria de Izquierda (ARDI) in Colombia in 1931 by Rómulo Betancourt and others. This later became the Partido Democrático Nacional, a forerunner of Democratic Action.

See also 

 Movimiento Estudiantil (Venezuela)

References

Bibliography

History of Venezuela
Prisoners and detainees of Venezuela
Student organizations in Venezuela